Emily Robin (1874 – 29 October 1929), also known as Lady Emily Robin or Madam Robin, was an infamous British bordello owner at the beginning of the 20th century.

Biography 
In 1898 she started a brothel in Hull, England, called "Gamine". It became one of the most notorious cat-houses in Western Europe, primarily for its large occupancy and the (relatively) high prices that were charged.

Robin insisted on being referred to, at least by her girls and customers, as Lady Robin, rather than the traditional, and in her opinion degrading, title of Madam.

She died after being run over by a wagon on Kensington High Street in London at the age of 55.

In film 
The character of Gabriella in the cult-classic Mad Dog Time is based on Robin.

References 
 

1874 births
1929 deaths
English brothel owners and madams
Road incident deaths in London
Pedestrian road incident deaths
Date of birth missing